Acronicta ovata, the ovate dagger moth, is a moth of the family Noctuidae. It is found from Nova Scotia to North Carolina, west to Texas, north to Manitoba.

The wingspan is 28–35 mm. Adults are on wing from June to September depending on the location. There are two or more generations per year.

The larvae feed on the leaves of beech, birch, chestnut and oak.

External links
Bug Guide

Acronicta
Moths of North America
Moths described in 1873